The Royal Tailor is a 2014 South Korean period film directed by Lee Won-suk, and starring Han Suk-kyu, Go Soo, Park Shin-hye and Yoo Yeon-seok. It tells the story of a rivalry between two tailors at the Sanguiwon, where the attire worn by royalty were made during the Joseon era, plunges the court into scandal and tragedy. The film was released in South Korea on December 24, 2014.

Plot
The film starts with a modern-day press conference, in which Jo Dol-seok is introduced as the only royal tailor, who single-handedly revolutionized the fashion of Korea's Joseon dynasty. Before one of his works is shown, the scene changes to the kingdom of Joseon, where a different story is told: Jo Dol-seok has tailored clothes for three generations of kings before finally becoming the head of the Sanguiwon, the department responsible for the royal attire. Jo was born a commoner, and looks forward to upgrading his social status after serving the royal family for thirty years. Careful to use the traditional rules and patterns, Dol-seok denies the Queen's request when she asks him to replace the king's robe that was accidentally burnt by a gungnyeo (female attendant). He insists that to do so would be against court customs, but also simply impossible in the short time before the robe is needed. Anxious to cover her mistake, the Queen looks for a designer elsewhere. She is introduced to Lee Gong-jin, a young designer whose good looks and expertise at making unconventional hanboks have charmed many women in the capital. He invented the bell-shaped design of hanboks and introduced new colors. Gong-jin falls in love with the Queen at first sight and uses his extraordinary gift as a tailor to save the dress. He subsequently becomes a tailor at the Sanguiwon and begins a prosperous career. He repeatedly uses his craft to support the Queen, who is at risk of being dethroned and replaced because she and the King - who never visits her - have no children.

Soon Dol-seok becomes jealous of the young designer's talent, whose creativeness he cannot rival with his use of the traditional shapes. He fears his own position will be undermined. He lets the King use him to frame Gong-jin for attempting to assassinate the King. The King then tries to lay the blame on the Queen for inciting the young tailor, but Gong-jin saves the Queen by claiming he acted on his own motives. Even when the young designer awaits his execution, the head tailor vows to have his name erased from history. Only when Gong-jin is dead, not only the queen, but eventually also Dol-seok silently mourn his death.

At the end of the film, women of Joseon are seen wearing Gong-jin's bell-shaped, merrily colored hanboks. In the last shot, Gong-jin's design of the queen's royal ceremonial dress is shown at the modern press conference, but as was hinted in the first scene, it is wrongly attributed to Jo Dol-seok.

Cast
Han Suk-kyu as Jo Dol-seok
Jo Hyeon-do as young Dol-seok
Go Soo as Lee Gong-jin
Park Shin-hye as the Queen
Yoo Yeon-seok as the King
Ma Dong-seok as Pan-soo
Shin So-yul as Wol-hyang
Lee Yu-bi as Royal concubine So-ui
Jo Dal-hwan as Dae-gil
Bae Sung-woo as Je-jo
Heo Sung-tae as Officer Jong
Kim Jae-hwa as Court Lady Jimil
Jung Sang-chul as the Chief State Councillor
Park Kyung-keun as an officer
Park So-dam as Yoo-wol
Woo Do-im as Hong-ok
Lee Do-yeon as Court lady Hong
Yang Eun-yong as Lady of the First Rank
Kwon Bang-hyun as Nurse Court Lady
Kang Ji-won as Madam Kim
Kim Hye-hwa as Madam Lee
Choi Hee-jin as Madam Park
Han Ji-eun as Courtesan 1 in Chwihyangru
Han Se-in as Courtesan 4 in Chwihyangru
Lee Da-hae as Courtesan 8 in Chwihyangru
Jeon So-ni as Tailor woman 1
Hwang In-moo as a gatekeeper
Kim Nam-woo as eunuch 1

Cameo
Park Gun-hyung as a nobleman in Chwihyangru
Park Byung-eun as the previous King
Park Yeong-gyu as yangban twins

Production
Filming began on February 21, 2014 and wrapped on July 2, 2014.

More than 1,000 hanbok appear in the film, with actress Park Shin-hye wearing 30 intricately embroidered pieces.  was spent on costumes, a significant portion of the film's  total budget. Costume designer Jo Sang-gyeong said she was inspired by the clothing during King Yeongjo's reign (1694–1776), which according to historical records was when a short jeogori, the jacket that sits on top of the dress, and jar-shaped skirts started to become fashionable.

Awards and nominations

References

External links
  
 
 
 

2014 films
2010s historical drama films
2010s Korean-language films
South Korean historical drama films
Fictional tailors
Films directed by Lee Won-suk
2010s South Korean films